The Anglo-Normans were the medieval ruling class in England, composed mainly of a combination of ethnic Normans, French, Anglo-Saxons, Flemings and Bretons, following the Norman conquest. A small number of Normans had earlier befriended future Anglo-Saxon king of England, Edward the Confessor, during his exile in his mother's homeland of Normandy in northern France. When he returned to England some of them went with him, and so there were Normans already settled in England prior to the conquest. Edward's successor, Harold Godwinson, was defeated by Duke William the Conqueror of Normandy at the Battle of Hastings, leading to William's accession to the English throne.

The victorious Normans formed a ruling class in Britain, distinct from (although inter-marrying with) the native populations. Over time their language evolved from the continental Old Norman to the distinct Anglo-Norman language. Anglo-Normans quickly established control over all of England, as well as parts of Wales (the Cambro-Normans). After 1130, parts of southern and eastern Scotland came under Anglo-Norman rule (the Scoto-Normans), in return for their support of David I's conquest. The Norman conquest of Ireland in 1169 saw Anglo-Normans and Cambro-Normans settle vast swaths of Ireland, becoming the Hiberno-Normans.

The composite expression regno Norman-Anglorum for the Anglo-Norman kingdom that comprises Normandy and England appears contemporaneously only in the Hyde Chronicle.

Norman conquest

After the Norman Conquest of 1066, many of the English nobles lost lands and titles; the lesser thegns and others found themselves dispossessed of lands and titles. A number of free geburs had their rights and court access much decreased, becoming unfree villeins, despite the fact that this status did not exist in Normandy itself (compared to other "French" regions). At the same time, many of the new Norman and Northern-France magnates were distributed lands by the King that had been taken from the English nobles. Some of these magnates used their original French-derived names, with the prefix 'de,' meaning they were lords of the old fiefs in France, and some instead dropped their original names and took their names from new English holdings.

The Norman conquest of England brought Britain and Ireland into the orbit of the European continent, especially what remained of Roman-influenced language and culture. The England emerging from the Conquest owed a debt to the Romance languages and the culture of ancient Rome. It transmitted itself in the emerging feudal world that took its place. That heritage can be discerned in language, incorporating the French language and the Roman past, and in the emerging Romanesque (Norman) architecture.

Military impact 
The Norman conquest of England also signalled a revolution in military styles and methods. The old Anglo-Saxon military elite began to emigrate, especially the generation next younger to that defeated at Hastings, who had no particular future in a country controlled by the conquerors. William (and his son, William Rufus), encouraged them to leave, as a security measure. The first to leave went mostly to Denmark and many of these moved on to join the Varangian Guard in Constantinople. The Anglo-Saxons as a whole, for practical reason, however were not demilitarised. Instead, William arranged for the Saxon infantry to be trained up by Norman cavalry in anti-cavalry tactics. This led quickly to the establishment of an Anglo-Norman army made up of Norman horsemen of noble blood, Saxon infantrymen often of equally noble blood, assimilated English freemen as rank-and-file, and foreign mercenaries and adventurers from other parts of the Continent. The younger Norman aristocracy showed a tendency towards Anglicisation, adopting such Saxon styles as long hair and moustaches, upsetting the older generation. (Note that the Anglo-Saxon cniht did not take the sense of the French chevalier before the latest period of Middle English. John Wycliffe (1380s) uses the term knyytis generically for men-at-arms, and only in the 15th century did the word acquire the overtones of a noble cavalryman corresponding to the meaning of chevalier).
The Anglo-Norman conquest in the 12th century brought Norman customs and culture to Ireland.

Norman-Saxon conflict 
The degree of subsequent Norman-Saxon conflict (as a matter of conflicting social identities) is a question disputed by historians. The 19th-century view was of intense mutual resentment, reflected in the popular legends of Robin Hood and the novel Ivanhoe by Sir Walter Scott. Some residual ill-feeling is suggested by contemporary historian Orderic Vitalis, who in Ecclesiastical Historii (1125) wrote in praise of native English resistance to "William the Bastard" (William I of England). In addition, a fine called the "murdrum", originally introduced to English law by the Danes under Canute, was revived, imposing on villages a high (46 mark/~£31) fine for the secret killing of a Norman (or an unknown person who was, under the murdrum laws, presumed to be Norman unless proven otherwise).

In order to secure Norman loyalty during his conquest, William I rewarded his loyal followers by taking English land and redistributing it to his knights, officials, and the Norman aristocracy. In turn, the English hated him, but the king retaliated ruthlessly with his military force to subdue the rebellions and discontentment. Mike Ashley writes on this subject; "he [William I] may have conquered them [the English], but he never ruled them". Not all of the Anglo-Saxons immediately accepted him as their legitimate king.

Whatever the level of dispute, over time, the two populations intermarried and merged. Eventually, even this distinction largely disappeared in the course of the Hundred Years War (1337–1453), and by the 14th century Normans identified themselves as English, having been fully assimilated into the emerging English population.

Wales 

The Normans also led excursions into Wales from England and built multiple fortifications as it was one of William's ambitions to subdue the Welsh as well as the English, however, he was not entirely successful. Afterward, however, the border area known as the Marches was set up and Norman influence increased steadily. Encouraged by the invasion, monks (usually from France or Normandy) such as the Cistercian Order also set up monasteries throughout Wales. By the 15th century a large number of Welsh gentry, including Owain Glyndŵr, had some Norman ancestry. The majority of knights who invaded Ireland were also from or based in Wales (see below).

Ireland 

Anglo-Norman barons also settled in Ireland from the 12th century, initially to support Irish regional kings such as Diarmuid Mac Murchadha whose name has arrived in modern English as Dermot MacMurrough. Richard de Clare, 2nd Earl of Pembroke, known as "Strongbow", was the leader of the Anglo-Norman Knights whom MacMurrough had requested of Henry II of England to help him to re-establish himself as King of Leinster.  Strongbow died a very short time after invading Ireland but the men he brought with him remained to support Henry II of England and his son John as Lord of Ireland. Chief among the early Anglo-Norman settlers was Theobald Walter (surname Butler) appointed hereditary chief Butler of Ireland in 1177 by King Henry II and founder of one of the oldest remaining British dignities. Most of these Normans came from Wales, not England, and thus the epithet 'Cambro-Normans' is used to describe them by leading late medievalists such as Seán Duffy. They increasingly integrated with the local Celtic nobility through intermarriage and  some accepted aspects of Celtic culture, especially outside the Pale around Dublin. They are known as Old English, but this term came into use to describe them only in 1580, i.e., over four centuries after the first Normans arrived in Ireland.

The Carol was a popular Norman dance in which the leader sang and was surrounded by a circle of dancers who replied with the same song. This Norman dance was performed in conquered Irish towns.

Scotland

David I, who had spent most of his life as an English baron, became king of Scotland in 1124. His reign saw what has been characterised as a "Davidian Revolution", by which native institutions and personnel were replaced by English and French ones. Members of the Anglo-Norman nobility took up places in the Scottish aristocracy and he introduced a system of feudal land tenure, which produced knight service, castles and an available body of heavily armed cavalry. He created an Anglo-Norman style of court, introduced the office of justiciar to oversee justice, and local offices of sheriffs to administer localities. He established the first royal burghs in Scotland, granting rights to particular settlements, which led to the development of the first true Scottish towns and helped facilitate economic development as did the introduction of the first recorded Scottish coinage. He continued a process begun by his mother and brothers, of helping to establish foundations that brought the reformed monasticism based on that at Cluny. He also played a part in the organisation of diocese on lines closer to those in the rest of Western Europe. These reforms were pursued under his successors and grandchildren Malcolm IV of Scotland and William I, with the crown now passing down the main line of descent through primogeniture, leading to the first of a series of minorities.

Anglo-Norman families

See also
Companions of William the Conqueror

References

Further reading
Crouch, David. The Normans: The History of a Dynasty. Hambledon & London, 2002.
Loyd, Lewis C. The Origins of Some Anglo-Norman Families. (Harleian Society Publications, vol. 103) The Society, 1951 (Genealogical Publishing Co., 1980).
Regesta Regum Anglo Normannorum, 1066–1154. (Henry William Davis & Robert J. Shotwell, eds) 4v. Clarendon Press, 1913 (AMS Press, 1987).
Douglas, David C., The Normans, Folio Society, London, 2002.
Villegas-Aristizabal, Lucas, "Anglo-Norman Involvement in the Conquest and Settlement of Tortosa, 1148–1180", Crusades vol. 8, 2009, pp. 63–129.

External links
Index of Tenants-in-Chief and the Families Holding of Them in England, The Origins of Some Anglo-Norman Families, Lewis Christopher Loyd, Charles Travis Clay, David Charles Douglas, The Harleian Society, Leeds, 1951

 
Medieval ethnic groups of Europe
Normans